Søren Toft Hansen (born 24 October 1992) is a Danish badminton player. He started his badminton career in Nyborg when he was 16. In the men's singles event, he won the 2017 Jamaica International tournament, and in the doubles event, he won the 2014 Mercosul International in Brazil, 2015 Lithuanian International, and also 2017 Bulgarian Open.

he now plays handball. he´s seen as a major handball talent after starting to play for SUS Nyborg

Achievements

BWF International Challenge/Series 
Men's singles

Men's doubles

Mixed doubles

  BWF International Challenge tournament
  BWF International Series tournament
  BWF Future Series tournament

References

External links 
 

1992 births
Living people
People from Nyborg
Danish male badminton players
Sportspeople from the Region of Southern Denmark